Sonja Hagemann (6 September 1898 – 17 October 1983) was a Norwegian literary historian and literary critic, especially of children's literature. She is primarily known for the monumental Barnelitteratur i Norge (Norwegian Children's Literature I:1965; II:1970; III:1973).

She was raised in Christiania (now Oslo) Norway. She graduated with a degree in economics at the University of Oslo (1919).
She first worked in government service. She worked at  Dagbladet as a critic of children's literature (1946-1971).
She received the Arts Council Norway Honorary Award (Norsk kulturråds ærespris) in 1980.

She represented the Liberal Party in Oslo school board. She was a parliamentary ballot candidate from the constituency of Oslo in 1965.

She was married to Otto Holmboe Hagemann (1891–1961) in 1925 and was the mother of geologist Fredrik Hagemann.

References

1898 births
1983 deaths
Writers from Oslo
University of Oslo alumni
Norwegian women critics
Norwegian women writers
Norwegian literary critics
Women literary critics
Norwegian women non-fiction writers
Norwegian literary historians
Liberal Party (Norway) politicians
Politicians from Oslo
Women literary historians
Norwegian women historians